Ferdiansyah (born 13 February 1983) is an Indonesian professional footballer who plays as a goalkeeper.

Honours

Club
Persipura Jayapura
Indonesia Super League: 2008–09, 2010–11
Indonesian Community Shield: 2009
Indonesian Inter Island Cup: 2011
 Indonesia Soccer Championship A: 2016

References

External links
 Ferdiansyah at Soccerway
 Ferdiansyah at Liga Indonesia

1983 births
Living people
Sportspeople from Malang
Indonesian footballers
Association football goalkeepers
Liga 1 (Indonesia) players
Liga 2 (Indonesia) players
Indonesian Super League-winning players
Persipura Jayapura players
Persiter Ternate players
Persma Manado players